Wine Harbour is a community located in Guyborough County along the Eastern Shore of Nova Scotia.

Natural setting

Wine Harbour is a rural area located on the east side of the harbour of the same name on the eastern shore of Nova Scotia. This shore is studded with bays and inlets.

Climate

The presence of the Atlantic Ocean gives the area a semi-maritime climate with a delay of seasons as compared with inland areas; however, frequent offshore winds bring continental-type weather with winter cold and summer heat. In late summer and fall, the area can be threatened by hurricanes or their extratropical remnants.

Geology, soils and vegetation

The bedrock is quartzite, which is almost entirely silicon dioxide with little more than trace amounts of nutrient-bearing minerals; consequently, the soils are infertile. They are also so stony as to be non-arable. The dominant soil, a Gleyed Humo-Ferric Podzol under the Canadian system of soil classification, is mapped as the Danesville Series. Somewhat stunted but well-exploited forests of black spruce, white spruce, tamarack and balsam fir alternate with treeless barrens and peat bogs. Pitcher plants and sundews are abundant in the bogs. The introduced white poplar is escaping from cultivation. Many other exotic plant species remain confined to residents' gardens, often in raised beds or even discarded automobile tires to avoid the stones. Seaweed, available at local beaches, is a very popular compost material.

History

A Portuguese vessel loaded with wine was wrecked here. Its cargo flowed into the harbour, establishing the name. The Indian name was "Pebumkeegunech" which when translated to English means "fish spawning place" or "an outlet cut through the sand". In 1818, one family consisting of five persons settled here and cleared . This was probably the family of John Walters, a native of North Carolina and a veteran of the American Revolutionary War who settled in Nova Scotia around 1811 or 1812.

By 1862, Wine Harbour was thriving rapidly. The main reason for its vigorous growth was the discovery of gold in July 1861 by Katie Doody and Joseph Smith, Sr. (probably not the Mormon;  probably descendant of William Ashmore Smyth of Smithfield NS) which was the beginning of a great gold boom which lasted until 1905. The first crusher used was called the Victoria Crusher and it was run by water power. The procedure began when the rocks were hoisted out of the ground by horses, put on wooden scowls and brought across the harbour, if the wind was favorable, to the Victoria Crusher which was on the then Thomas Cooper property. The surveyor for the mining company at this time was D. W. Crockett. At the peak of this gold boom there were ten crushers run by steam power using coal, which was brought from vessels from Sydney. Because of the gold mine, Wine Harbour was one of the first settlements in Guysborough County to have electricity.

After 1905 the gold mining industry lay desolate until 1936 when C. Irving supervised the opening of the once prosperous gold mines. It died the following year and Wine Harbour lost its once booming industry forever. At the time of the gold mining industry Wine Harbour was also growing in other aspects. Thomas Lucas had a hotel and store and the Irwin family had a number of general stores throughout the area. A lobster factory was located in the area whose foreman was John Ballantyne and a blacksmith shop and a bank were also in the area. Postmaster at this time was John Gilles. St. Patrick's Mission Church was built in 1857 to replace a larger church that had been destroyed by a hurricane. A Union Church was dedicated to Baptists, Anglicans and Presbyterians in 1897, and is no longer in existence. St. Patrick's Mission Church has been vacant since 1955. * The first schoolhouse was built in 1869 and 85 pupils were registered at this time. Before this it was believed that the original Catholic Church was used during the week as a schoolroom for the children.

After 1905, limited farming, fishing and logging were the main industries and the 1956 population decreased to 50. Today the population of the community is about 25. Wine Harbour has lost its gold mines, its factories, most of its fishing, many of its forests, a church and the majority of its people. Its history will remain.

In 2014 the current population stands at 9.

References
 History of Wine Harbour
J.D. Hilchey, D.B. Cann, and J.I. MacDougall, 1964. Soil Survey of Guysborough County, Nova Scotia. Report No. 14, Nova Scotia Soil Survey.

Communities in Guysborough County, Nova Scotia
General Service Areas in Nova Scotia